Government High School (GHS) Limbe is a secondary/high grammar school in Limbe, Fako, South West Region, Cameroon, located along the Mile 4 - Idenau Road, adjacent to Government Bilingual High School Limbe (GBHS).
Its motto is "Laborare et Servire" (in Latin).
It is called the School of Reference because it sets the pace for other schools to follow. It is known for producing excellent results in the GCE Ordinary and Advanced levels.

See also 
 Government Bilingual High School Limbe
 National Comprehensive High School
 Saker Baptist College
 Education in Cameroon

References

Secondary schools in Cameroon
Southwest Region (Cameroon)